Gaudenzio Bernasconi (8 August 1932 – 10 January 2023) was an Italian football player and coach, who played as a midfielder. He held the record for most appearances for Sampdoria with 334, and is now third, behind only Roberto Mancini and Moreno Mannini.

Club career
Bernasconi played for 13 seasons (388 games, no goals) in the Italian Serie A for Atalanta B.C. and U.C. Sampdoria.

International career
Bernasconi made his debut for the Italy national team on 25 April 1956 in a game against Brazil. In total, he obtained six caps for Italy between 1956 and 1959.

References

External links
 

1932 births
2023 deaths
Italian footballers
Association football midfielders
Italy international footballers
Serie A players
Atalanta B.C. players
U.C. Sampdoria players
Italian football managers
A.C. Ponte San Pietro Isola S.S.D. players
S.S.D. Jesina Calcio players
Sportspeople from the Province of Bergamo
People from Ponte San Pietro